Rosendo Porlier y Asteguieta (1771–1819) was a Peruvian-born Spanish admiral, Brigadier of the Royal Spanish Navy. Porlier Bay in Livingston Island, Antarctica, where he died, is named after him.

See also
San Telmo (ship)
Spanish Navy

Spanish admirals
People of the Peninsular War
Order of Santiago
1771 births
1819 deaths
People from Lima
Spanish commanders of the Napoleonic Wars